The Isa-Beaujon cabinet was the 7th cabinet of the Netherlands Antilles.

Composition
The cabinet was composed as follows:

|rowspan="3"|Minister of General Affairs
|Ramez Jorge Isa
|DP
|12 February 1971
|-
|Otto R.A. Beaujon
|DP
|27 May 1971
|-
|Ramez Jorge Isa
|DP
|15 November 1972
|-
|rowspan="2"|Minister of Justice
|Ernesto Petronia
|PPA
|12 February 1971
|-
|Hubert R. Dennert
|PPA
|7 July 1971
|-
|rowspan="2"|Minister of Finance
|Francisco Jose Tromp 
|PPA
|12 February 1971
|-
|Hubert R. Dennert
|PPA
|16 May 1973
|-
|rowspan="2"|Minister of Education and Cultural Affairs
|Otto R.A Beaujon
|DP
|12 February 1971
|-
|Ricardo Elhage
|DP
|7 July 1971
|-
|rowspan="2"|Minister of Labor and Social Affairs
|Frank J. Pijpers
|DP
|12 February 1971
|-
|Rufus F. McWilliams
|PNP
|7 July 1971
|-
|rowspan="2"|Minister of Public Health and Social Welfare
|Otto R.A Beaujon
|DP
|12 February 1971
|-
|Lucinda da Costa Gomez-Matheeuws
|PNP
|7 July 1971
|-
|rowspan="2"|Minister of Welfare
||Hubert R. Dennert
|PPA
|12 February 1971
|-
|Frank J. Pijpers
|DP
|7 July 1971
|-
|Minister of Economic Affairs
|D. Guzman Croes
|AVP
|12 February 1971
|-
|Minister of Traffic and Communications
|Leo A.I. Chance
|PPA
|12 February 1971
|}

 Francisco Jose Tromp was appointed Lieutenant governor of Aruba.

References

Cabinets of the Netherlands Antilles
1971 establishments in the Netherlands Antilles
Cabinets established in 1971
Cabinets disestablished in 1973
1973 disestablishments in the Netherlands Antilles